Pachydactylus atorquatus, also known as the Augrabies gecko or Good's gecko, is a thick-toed gecko belonging to the Pachydactylus weberi group, found in South Africa.

References

atorquatus
Endemic reptiles of South Africa
Lizards of Africa
Reptiles of South Africa
Reptiles described in 2006